Raymond Forni (20 May 1941 – 5 January 2008) was a French Socialist politician.

Biography
The son of an Italian immigrant from Piedmont, Forni was born in Belfort, in 1941. His father died when he was 11. At 17, he had to stop studying, and he started to work as an unskilled worker in Peugeot factories. He finally graduated from high school at 21 and started law studies at the University of Strasbourg. He became a lawyer at the age of 27 years.

Member of the Socialist Party, his political career started in 1971 when he became municipal council. In 1973, he was elected as deputy of Territoire de Belfort département. He got reelected  four times consecutively, until 2002. 
He was President of the National Assembly from 2000 to 2002. He was president of the Franche-Comté regional council from 2 April 2004, until his death.

He died in Paris on 5 January 2008, at the age of 66, of leukaemia. He was married twice and had five sons.

He was awarded Grand Cross of the Order of Merit of the Republic of Poland (2000).

Political career
National Assembly of France
 President of the National Assembly of France: 2000-2002.
 Vice President of the National Assembly: 1991-1993/1998-2000.
 President of Law Committee in the National Assembly: 1981-1985.
 Member of the National Assembly of France for Territoire de Belfort (1st constituency): 1973-1985 (Resignation)/1988-1993/1997-2002.

Regional Council
 President of the Regional Council of Franche-Comté : 2004-2008 (died  2008)
 Regional councillor of Franche-Comté: 2004-2008.

General Council
 General councillor of the Territoire de Belfort : 1976-1982/1987-2001. Elected in 1976, reelected in 1987, 1988, 1994.

Municipal Council
 Mayor of Delle: 1991-2004 (Resignation).
 1st deputy-mayor of Delle: 1989-91/2004-08 (died 2008)
 Municipal councillor of Delle: 1989-2008 (died 2008)
 Municipal councillor of Montreux-Château (1971–77)
 Municipal councillor of Fontaine: 1983-89

Bibliography
Un enfant de la République (a son of the Republic), in 2002

References

1941 births
2008 deaths
Politicians  from Belfort
Deaths from cancer in France
Deaths from leukemia
Presidents of the National Assembly (France)
President of Franche-Comté
University of Strasbourg alumni
Socialist Party (France) politicians
French people of Italian descent
People of Piedmontese descent